This is a list of English football transfers for the 2017 summer transfer window. Only moves featuring at least one Premier League or Championship club are listed.

The summer transfer window began once clubs had concluded their final domestic fixture of the 2016–17 season, but many transfers only officially went through on 1 July because the majority of player contracts finished on 30 June. The window remained open until 18:00 BST on 1 September 2017. The window shut at 18:00 BST this time due to the UEFA player registration deadlines for both the Champions League and Europa League ending at 23:00 BST, giving the 6 sides still in Europe time to conclude deals and register their player for continental matches if appropriate.

This list also includes transfers featuring at least one Premier League or Championship club which were completed after the end of the winter 2016–17 transfer window and before the end of the 2017 summer window.

Players without a club may join at any time, and clubs below Premier League level may sign players on loan during loan windows. Clubs may be permitted to sign a goalkeeper on an emergency loan if they have no registered goalkeeper available.

2017 Summer Transfers 
All clubs without a flag are English. Note that while Swansea City, Cardiff City and Newport County are affiliated with the Football Association of Wales and thus take the Welsh flag, they play in the English football league system, and so their transfers are included here.

Transfers

Loans

Unattached Players 

 Player officially joined his club on 10 June 2017.
 Player officially joined his club on 1 July 2017.
 Player officially joined his club on 3 July 2017.
 Player will officially join his club on 24 July 2017.

Notes

References

Transfers Summer 2017
Summer 2017
English